Quintain may refer to:

 Quintain (company), a British property investment and development business
 Quintain (jousting), lance games
 Quintain (poetry), a poetic form containing five lines
 Slovene quintain, a traditional mounted folk game

See also

Quintaine Americana, a rock band